The Lost River is a tributary of the Roseau River in northern Minnesota in the United States.  Via the Roseau River, the Red River of the North, Winnipeg Lake, and the Nelson River, it is part of the Hudson Bay watershed.

See also
List of rivers of Minnesota

References

External links
Minnesota Watersheds
USGS Hydrologic Unit Map - State of Minnesota (1974)

Rivers of Minnesota
Tributaries of Hudson Bay